The International Academy of Mathematical Chemistry (IAMC) was founded in Dubrovnik (Croatia) in 2005 by Milan Randić. It is an organization for chemistry and mathematics avocation, and its predecessors have been around since the 1930s. The Academy Members are 88 (2011) from all over the world (27 countries), comprising six scientists awarded the Nobel Prize.

Governing Body of the IAMC
 2005-2007:
  President: Alexandru Balaban
  Vice-President: Milan Randić
  Secretary: Ante Graovac
  Treasurer: Dejan Plavšić
 2008-2011:
  President: Roberto Todeschini 
  Vice-President: Tomaž Pisanski
  Secretary: Ante Graovac
  Treasurer: Dražen Vikić-Topić 
  Member: Ivan Gutman 
  Member: Nikolai Zefirov 
 since 2011:
  President: Roberto Todeschini 
  Vice-President: Edward C. Kirby 
  Vice-President: Sandi Klavžar
  Secretary: Ante Graovac
  Treasurer: Dražen Vikić-Topić 
  Member: Ivan Gutman 
  Member: Nikolai Zefirov

IAMC yearly meetings
 2005 Dubrovik (Croatia) 
 2006 Dubrovik (Croatia) 
 2007 Dubrovik (Croatia) 
 2008 Verbania (Italy) 
 2009 Dubrovik (Croatia) 
 2010 Dubrovik (Croatia) 
 2011 Bled (Slovenia) 
 2012 Verona (Italy)

See also
Mathematical chemistry

References

Mathematical chemistry
International academies
Scientific organizations established in 2005
2005 establishments in Croatia